Vaapsi (Return) is an Indian punjabi language drama film directed by Rakesh Mehta and starring Harish Verma, Sameksha, Dhrriti Saharan and Gulshan Grover as the main protagonists of the film. This film is about a young probable hockey player, Ajit Singh, who gets trapped in a tragic situation during the dark days of Punjab. The trailer of the movie was released on 13 April 2016. The release date of the film is 3 June 2016.

Plot
Vaapsi film is the story of those youngsters, who left their country after 1984 massacre to survive and settle in other countries. Now all of them just want to come back to their native homes. They are eagerly waiting for the moment when they will come back to their country.

The main protagonist of the story, Ajit Singh (Harish Verma), resides with his parents and sister

Music

Cast
Harish Verma as Ajit Singh
Dhrriti Saharan as Rajjo
Sameksha as Jeetan
Gulshan Grover as Ajit Singh
 Ashish Duggal as G.S Bawa
 Lakhwinder Shabla
 Mandeep Kaur

References

External links 
 Badman Return as Goodman
 Vaapsi Movie Review

2016 films
Punjabi-language Indian films
2010s Punjabi-language films
Insurgency in Punjab in fiction
Fictional portrayals of the Punjab Police (India)